The 2017 Campeonato Nacional de Fútbol de Cuba was the 106th season of the competition. The season began on 19 February 2017 and concluded on 1 July 2017.

First stage

Group A

Group B

Group C

Final stage

References

Campeonato Nacional de Fútbol de Cuba seasons
Cuba
Cuba
football